Douglas or Doug Collins may refer to:

 Doug Collins (basketball) (born 1951), American basketball executive and former player, coach, and sports analyst
 Doug Collins (Canadian football) (born 1945), Canadian football player
 Doug Collins (footballer) (born 1945), English former footballer
 Doug Collins (journalist) (1920–2001), Canadian journalist and Holocaust denier
 Doug Collins (politician) (born 1966), former U.S. Representative